Ignacio Aldama (died June 20, 1811) was a Mexican revolutionary and brother of Juan Aldama. 

Ignacio Aldama was born in San Miguel de Allende, Guanajuato.  He was a lawyer, but devoted himself to commercial projects with marked success. From the beginning of the Mexican War of Independence he joined Miguel Hidalgo y Costilla, was soon promoted to the rank of general, and was then appointed minister to the United States, in hope of obtaining help from this nation. But, on reaching Bejar, he found that some insurgents, led by Juan Manuel Zambrano, were preparing a revolt against the revolutionary authorities. These being overpowered by the new insurgents, March 1, 1811, Aldama was arrested and sent to Monclova, where he was executed on June 20, 1811.

Created via preloaddraft

Year of birth missing
1811 deaths